Danuta Piecyk (born 27 September 1950) is a Polish sprinter. She competed in the women's 400 metres at the 1972 Summer Olympics.

References

1950 births
Living people
Athletes (track and field) at the 1972 Summer Olympics
Polish female sprinters
Olympic athletes of Poland
Place of birth missing (living people)
Olympic female sprinters